Lechenaultia hortii, commonly known as Hort's leschenaultia, is a species of flowering plant in the family Goodeniaceae and is endemic to a restricted part of the south-west of Western Australia. It is an erect to spreading subshrub or herb with fleshy stems, linear leaves, and blue to pale blue and white flowers.

Description
Flowering mainly occurs from November to December.

Taxonomy
Lechenaultia hortii was first formally described in 2006 by Leigh W. Sage in the journal Nuytsia from specimens collected south-west of York in 2003. The specific epithet (hortii) honours Fred Hort, for his efforts in flora conservation in Western Australia.

Distribution and habitat
Hort's leschenaultia grows in open woodland, and is known from only three locations in a national park near York in the Jarrah Forest biogeographic region of south-western Western Australia.

Conservation status
This leschenaultia is listed as "Priority Two" by the Western Australian Government Department of Biodiversity, Conservation and Attractions, meaning that it is poorly known and from only one or a few locations.

References

hortii
Plants described in 2006
Flora of Western Australia